Iron Angel is a 1964 American Korean War film co-produced, written and directed by Ken Kennedy. It was shot near Phoenix, Arizona.

Plot summary 
A US Army truck convoy is halted by North Korean artillery fire. A Lieutenant is sent out to locate and destroy the enemy's artillery piece with a patrol of picked men including a sergeant the lieutenant feels is a coward. On the way they come across an unconscious US Army Nurse and her ambulance, nicknamed "the Iron Angel". The patrol uses the ambulance to attract the enemy's fire enabling the patrol to engage them.

Cast
 Jim Davis as Sergeant Walsh
 Don "Red" Barry as "Reb"
 L. Q. Jones as "Buttons"
 Margo Woode as Nurse Lieutenant Laura Fleming
 Tristram Coffin as Captain
 R. Wayland Williams as Corporal Walker
 Dave Barker as Private Drake
 Joe Jenckes as Lieutenant Collins
 John Hirohata as Korean Officer

Notes

External links 

1964 films
1964 drama films
American war drama films
American black-and-white films
Korean War films
Films about nurses
1960s English-language films
1960s American films